Aleksandr Pavlov (born July 9, 1973) is a Belarusian wrestler. At the 1996 Summer Olympics he won the silver medal in the men's Greco-Roman Light Flyweight (under 48 kg) category.

References

External links
 

Wrestlers at the 1996 Summer Olympics
Belarusian male sport wrestlers
Olympic wrestlers of Belarus
Olympic silver medalists for Belarus
1973 births
Living people
Olympic medalists in wrestling
World Wrestling Championships medalists
Medalists at the 1996 Summer Olympics
20th-century Belarusian people
21st-century Belarusian people